Schuyler Creek is a river located in Seneca County, New York. It flows into Cayuga Lake by Fayette, New York.

References

Rivers of Seneca County, New York
Rivers of New York (state)
Fayette, New York